Albert Edward Smith (1871–1947) was a Canadian religious leader and politician.

Albert Edward Smith may also refer to:

 Albert Smith (South Australian politician) (1881–1965), Australian politician
 A. E. Smith (violin maker) (1880–1978), English-born Australian violin and viola maker
 Albert E. Smith (producer) (1875–1958), English stage magician, film director and producer
 Albert Edward Smith, founder of the Australian company AE Smith